Avilla is a census-designated place in Saline County, Arkansas, United States. Per the 2020 census, the population was 1,325.

Demographics

2020 census

Note: the US Census treats Hispanic/Latino as an ethnic category. This table excludes Latinos from the racial categories and assigns them to a separate category. Hispanics/Latinos can be of any race.

References

Census-designated places in Saline County, Arkansas
Census-designated places in Arkansas
Census-designated places in Little Rock–North Little Rock–Conway metropolitan area